Francisco Rodríguez Márquez (born 19 May 1953) is a Cuban rower. He competed in the men's quadruple sculls event at the 1976 Summer Olympics.

References

1953 births
Living people
Cuban male rowers
Olympic rowers of Cuba
Rowers at the 1976 Summer Olympics
Place of birth missing (living people)
Rowers at the 1975 Pan American Games
Rowers at the 1979 Pan American Games
Pan American Games medalists in rowing
Pan American Games gold medalists for Cuba
Pan American Games bronze medalists for Cuba
Medalists at the 1975 Pan American Games
Medalists at the 1979 Pan American Games